Sprinkles are decorative candy

Sprinkles may refer to:

Small particles:
 Nonpareils, a slightly different decorative candy 

Weather:
 Term sometimes used for light rain

Other
 Sprinkles Cupcakes, a cupcake bakery chain
 A surname

See also 
 Sprinkle (disambiguation)